The Katanga caco or Katanga metal frog (Cacosternum leleupi) is a species of frog in the family Pyxicephalidae, endemic to Democratic Republic of the Congo.
Its natural habitats are moist savanna, subtropical or tropical seasonally wet or flooded lowland grassland, intermittent rivers, swampland, and intermittent freshwater marshes.

References

Cacosternum
Endemic fauna of the Democratic Republic of the Congo
Taxa named by Raymond Laurent
Amphibians described in 1950
Taxonomy articles created by Polbot